The 1982 Oregon State Beavers football team represented Oregon State University in the Pacific-10 Conference (Pac-10) during the 1982 NCAA Division I-A football season.  In their third season under head coach Joe Avezzano, the Beavers compiled a 1–9–1 record (0–7–1 against Pac-10 opponents), finished in last place in the Pac-10, and were outscored by their opponents, 306 to 134.  The team played its home games at Parker Stadium in Corvallis, Oregon.

Schedule

References

Oregon State
Oregon State Beavers football seasons
Oregon State Beavers football